Serpokrylovo is a rural locality (a selo) in Borodachyovskoye Rural Settlement, Zhirnovsky District, Volgograd Oblast, Russia. The population was 54 as of 2010. There are 2 streets.

Geography 
Serpokrylovo is located in forest steppe of Volga Upland, 67 km southeast of Zhirnovsk (the district's administrative centre) by road. Chizhi is the nearest rural locality.

References 

Rural localities in Zhirnovsky District